Gábor Reszli (born 20 January 1988 in Kaposvár) is a Hungarian football player who currently plays for Kaposvári Rákóczi FC.

References
Player profile at HLSZ 

1988 births
Living people
People from Kaposvár
Hungarian footballers
Association football forwards
Kaposvári Rákóczi FC players
Sportspeople from Somogy County